The Selbsanft is a mountain massif in the Glarus Alps, overlooking the village of Linthal in the canton of Glarus. The Selbsanft is a large mountain massif consisting of several summits of which the highest is named Hideri Schibe. The massif is a buttress of the Bifertenstock and forms, along with Schiben, the ridge that separates the valleys of the Sand (west) and Limmernsee (east). A small glacier lies east of the summit.

The five main summits are, from north to south, the Vorder Selbsanft, also known as Hauserhorn (there are higher summits between the Vorder and Mittler Selbsanft, though), Mitttler Selbsanft, also known in Grison as Plattas Alvas, the Hinter Selbsanft, the highest peak of the Selbsanft triple. In a broader sense, the Vorderi Schibe and the Hinderi Schibe, the highest summit of this massif, re also part of the massif.

The mountain lies within the municipality of Glarus Süd.

References

External links

Selbsanft on Hikr

Mountains of the Alps
Alpine three-thousanders
Mountains of Switzerland
Mountains of the canton of Glarus